is a Shinto shrine located in Sangō, Nara in Japan.

The Shrine became the object of Imperial patronage during the early Heian period.  In 965, Emperor Murakami ordered that Imperial messengers were sent to report important events to the guardian kami of Japan. These heihaku were initially presented to 16 shrines including the Tatsuta Shrine.

See also 
 List of Shinto shrines
 Twenty-Two Shrines
 Modern system of ranked Shinto Shrines
 Tatsuta Maru
Beppyo shrines

Notes

References
 Breen, John and Mark Teeuwen. (2000).  Shinto in History: Ways of the Kami. Honolulu: University of Hawaii Press. 
 Ponsonby-Fane, Richard. (1962).   Studies in Shinto and Shrines. Kyoto: Ponsonby Memorial Society. OCLC 399449
 . (1959).  The Imperial House of Japan. Kyoto: Ponsonby Memorial Society. OCLC 194887

Shinto shrines in Nara Prefecture
Kanpei-taisha